Laurel Martyn  (23 July 1916 – 16 October 2013) was an Australian ballerina.

In 1933, she left Australia for England and studied with Phyllis Bedells. In 1934 she won a choreographic scholarship from the Association of Operatic Dancing (later the Royal Academy of Dance) for Exile, her first composition. In 1935 she became the first Australian to win the Adeline Genée Gold Medal. Martyn joined the Vic-Wells Ballet (later Sadler's Wells) in December 1935, the first Australian woman to be accepted into the company. By 1938, she was a soloist. That same year, she returned to Australia and became a dance teacher. She joined Edouard Borovansky's eponymous ballet corps in 1940 and remained until her marriage to Lloyd Lawton in 1945.  she then continued dancing and died at the age of 97 in the 2013

Works
After leaving the Borovansky Ballet in 1945, Martyn began creating her own dance works. These included The Sentimental Bloke Who Couldn't Be a Man in 1952 and Mathinna in 1954. These works were inspired by Australian themes. The Sentimental Bloke used Australian literature for inspiration and Mathinna, concerning an Aboriginal Tasmanian girl adopted into white society, explored the political, social and racial implications of relationships between Aboriginal Australians and colonial settlers.

Later years
She also was instrumental in forming the Young Dancers' Theatre, for which she choreographed several works in the 1980s, and the Classical Dance Teachers Australia Inc, which provided in-service training for dance teachers.

References

External links
Laurel Martyn Collection at the Australian Performing Arts Collection, Arts Centre Melbourne

1916 births
2013 deaths
Australian ballerinas
Dancers of The Royal Ballet
People from Toowoomba
Place of death missing
Australian Officers of the Order of the British Empire
Australian expatriates in the United Kingdom